Newhall station is a intermodal hub in the Newhall neighborhood of Santa Clarita, California. The station is served by Metrolink's Antelope Valley Line operating between Los Angeles Union Station and Lancaster, Amtrak Thruway buses connecting to/from San Joaquins trains in Bakersfield, and serves as a transfer point in the City of Santa Clarita Transit system. 

Newhall was built as an infill station on the busy Antelope Valley Line and opened on March 18, 2000. The official name of the station is Jan Heidt Newhall Metrolink station in honor of Jan Heidt, one of the original members of the Santa Clarita city council.

Services

Metrolink 
The station is served by 22 Metrolink trains (11 in each direction) each weekday running primarily at peak hours in the peak direction of travel. Weekend service consists of 12 trains (6 in each direction) on both Saturday and Sunday evenly spaced throughout the day.

Bus and coach services

City of Santa Clarita Transit 
The station serves as a major transfer station for City of Santa Clarita Transit routes:
Local: 4, 5, 6, 12, 14
Commuter Express: 757, 796, 797, 799
Beach Bus (Summer Only): 102

Acton & Agua Dulce Shuttle 
Los Angeles County Department of Public Works operates the Acton & Agua Dulce Shuttle between Santa Clarita and the communities of Acton and Agua Dulce. The shuttle operates on Monday, Wednesday and Saturday and makes a round-trip in the morning and in the evening.

Amtrak Thruway 
Amtrak Thruway buses offer connections between Newhall station and San Joaquins trains to Oakland and Sacramento through route 1C buses that travel to and from Bakersfield station. During the overnight hours, when San Joaquins trains aren't running, route 1 buses serve Newhall station.

 Route 1C: Santa Monica – Westwood/UCLA – Burbank Airport – Bakersfield
 Route 1: San Diego – Santa Ana – Los Angeles – Bakersfield (limited late-night service)

Antelope Valley Transit Authority 
Newhall serves as the connection point to the Antelope Valley Transit Authority route 790, the North County TRANSporter. The route allows Metrolink passengers on mid-day trains (that only go as far as the Santa Clarita Valley) to travel to the Palmdale station.

See also 
 McBean Regional Transit Center
 Santa Clara River Trail
 Lang Southern Pacific Station a California Historic Landmark

References

External links 

Metrolink stations in Los Angeles County, California
Railway stations in the United States opened in 2000
Santa Clarita, California
2000 establishments in California
Amtrak Thruway Motorcoach stations in California